The 2020 Los Angeles County elections were held on November 3, 2020, in Los Angeles County, California, with nonpartisan blanket primary elections for certain offices being held on March 3. Three of the five seats of the Board of Supervisors were up for election, as well as one of the countywide elected officials, the District Attorney. In addition, elections were held for various community college districts and water districts, as well as the Superior Court.

Municipal elections in California are officially nonpartisan; candidates' party affiliations do not appear on the ballot.

Board of Supervisors 

Three of the five seats of the Los Angeles County Board of Supervisors were up for election to four-year terms. Incumbent supervisors Janice Hahn and Kathryn Barger handily won re-election in the primary. In the second district, incumbent Mark Ridley-Thomas was term-limited and could not seek re-election to a fourth term, opting instead to run for Los Angeles City Council. State senator Holly Mitchell and Los Angeles City Councilor Herb Wesson advanced to the general election, eliminating former L.A. city councilor Jan Perry and Carson mayor Albert Robles. Mitchell won the general election, resulting in a supervisor board consisting entirely of women for the first time in its history.

District Attorney 

Incumbent District Attorney Jackie Lacey ran for re-election to a third four-year term. Following the murder of George Floyd and the subsequent protests advocating for criminal justice reform, Lacey's "tough-on-crime" policies were criticized and contrasted with those of her opponents, former San Francisco District Attorney George Gascón and public defender Rachel Rossi. Gascón defeated Lacey in the general election by a small margin. Lacey became the first district attorney to lose re-election since Gil Garcetti lost to Steve Cooley in 2000.

Candidates

Advanced to runoff 
 George Gascón, former San Francisco District Attorney and former LAPD Assistant Chief of Police
 Jackie Lacey, incumbent District Attorney

Eliminated in primary 
 Rachel Rossi, public defender and former Counsel to the House Judiciary Committee

Endorsements

Polling

Results

College districts

Compton 
The Compton Community College District held elections for its board of trustees in two areas on November 3. Incumbent Sonia Lopez of Area 3 was re-elected unopposed.

Area 2

Long Beach 
The Long Beach Community College District held elections for its board of trustees in two areas on November 3. Incumbent Vivian Williams Malauulu of Area 2 was re-elected unopposed.

Area 4

Los Angeles 
The Los Angeles Community College District held elections held elections for its board of trustees for four of its seven seats on November 3.

Seat 1

Seat 3

Seat 5

Seat 7

Superior Court 
Twelve elections were held for judges to the Los Angeles County Superior Court on March 3. Three runoff elections were held on November 3. Judges are elected to six-year terms.

Office 17

Office 42

Office 72

Office 76

Office 80

Office 97

Office 129

Office 131

Office 141

Office 145

Office 150

Office 162

See also 
 Government of Los Angeles County
 2020 California elections

Notes

References 

Los Angeles County
Los Angeles County